The CTFD PortoGaia (Centro de Treinos e Formação Desportiva PortoGaia; English: PortoGaia Sports Training Center) is a football training complex located in Vila Nova de Gaia, Portugal, that is used by the senior, reserve and youth teams of FC Porto.

Designed by Portuguese architect Alcino Soutinho and inaugurated in the summer of 2002, the complex is property of the Vila Nova de Gaia municipality, with the official name CTFD Olival/Crestuma. It had a construction cost of €16 million but was leased to FC Porto for €500 a month for a period of 50 years.

Facilities
One grass pitch with a 3,800-capacity grandstand and floodlighting
Three grass pitches for training purposes
One artificial turf pitch with floodlighting
One artificial turf mini-pitch (40×30 metres)
Three support buildings:
Entry building (reception, cafeteria, press center and auditorium)
Youth teams (three team dressrooms, one referee dressroom, one coach dressroom, medical department, and hydrotherapy room)
Senior team (two team dressrooms, two coach dressrooms, two medical support rooms, hydrotherapy and massage room, gym)

References

FC Porto
Sports venues in Porto
PortoGaia